Blazing Sixes is a 1937 American Western film directed by Noel M. Smith and written by John T. Neville. The film stars Dick Foran, Joan Valerie, Mira McKinney, John Merton, Glenn Strange and Kenneth Harlan. It was the 9th of 12 B-westerns Foran starred in for the studio, and is noteworthy for giving perennial villain Strange a rare good-guy role as the simple-minded cowhand Pee Wee. The film was released by Warner Bros. on June 12, 1937.

Plot
The plot follows government agent Red Barton as he goes into a small Western town in order to find the source of recent gold robberies, and Barbara Morgan who goes into the city to claim a ranch that is part of her inheritance, but that also serves as the headquarters of an outlaw gang.

Cast  
Dick Foran as Red Barton
Joan Valerie as Barbara Morgan (billed as Helen Valkis)
Mira McKinney as Aunt Sarah
John Merton as Jim Hess
Glenn Strange as Peewee (misspelled as Glen Strange)
Kenneth Harlan as Major Taylor
Milton Kibbee as Mort 
Gordon Hart as Gore
Henry Otho as Chuck
Wilfred Lucas as Sheriff Tom
Bud Osborne as Dave 
Tom Foreman as Buck 
Ben Corbett as Slim
Malcolm Waite as Jamison 
Bob Burns as Mike
Jack Mower as Wells Fargo Agent

References

External links 
 

1937 films
American Western (genre) films
1937 Western (genre) films
Warner Bros. films
Films directed by Noel M. Smith
American black-and-white films
1930s English-language films
1930s American films